Dr. Ram Babu Harit is an Indian politician and member of the Bhartiya Janta Party. Harit was a member of the Uttar Pradesh Legislative Assembly from the Agra West constituency in Agra district as Bharatiya Janata Party candidate.

Early life and education 
Dr. Harit was born on 2 February 1957 in Agra district of Uttar Pradesh. His father Late Shri Sitaram was into agriculture earlier who later started doing trading business of raw material of shoes to support his family. He was the youngest of four brothers and one sister. Harit was always interested in studies and had completed his studies from Government InterCollege. He topped his class in high school and was inclined in choosing medical field as his profession. He cleared UPCPMT and did his MBBS from Motilal Nehru Medical college, Allahabad.

Career 

He started his career as a class one medical officer in Indian government. He worked in Ram Manohar Lohia Hospital, Delhi then shifted to CGHS as a resident doctor and later served in ESI hospital, Raja Garden. He was a part of team of doctors who looked after a team of sportsmen in Asian games, Delhi. While serving in Delhi he was married. Since his parents were getting old, he left his government job and shifted back to Agra to open his own clinic and take care of his parents.

He was a part of RSS and was a regular attendee of Shakhas. His simplicity and urge for social work was seen by some senior politicians who invited him to join the Bharitya Janta Party. He was inspired by the policies of seniors like Deen Dayal Upadhyay and Shyama Prasad Mukherjee and chose to be actively involved in social work.
 
He started his political career as Coordinator by winning elections in his ward.
He was then the deputy mayor for Agra.
Harit succeeded Kishan Gopal as an MLA in the year 1992. He retained his position in next election in the year 1996. Looking at the educational background and Harit's leadership, he was made the minister of health and medicine during the government of Late Shri Ram Prakash Gupt. He retained the ministry when Rajnath Singh took over as the chief minister of Uttar Pradesh. He was often seen commuting on his scooter without any security during his time as a minister.  His simplicity and attachment with public especially the weaker norms of the society helped him to win the elections for third time in the year 2002. Currently Harit is a part of working committee of BJP in UP.

Family

Harit married Kamlesh Kumari in 1984 and was blessed with a daughter Arunika and a son Amit. Kamlesh, MA in history, took care of the family as a home maker for almost two decades. 
She later joined as a first class magistrate Agra collectorate and was a part of consumer forum as a judge. Kamlesh retired from the bench in 2014 and is now running an NGO for under privileged section of the society.

References 

Politicians from Agra
Bharatiya Janata Party politicians from Uttar Pradesh
Members of the Uttar Pradesh Legislative Assembly
Bahujan Samaj Party politicians from Uttar Pradesh
Living people
21st-century Indian politicians
State cabinet ministers of Uttar Pradesh
Dalit activists
Year of birth missing (living people)